CCGS can refer to:
Canadian Coast Guard Ship, a ship prefix
Central Coast Grammar School, a school in Australia
Christ Church Grammar School, a school in Australia
Cooperating Colleges of Greater Springfield
Crown Championship: Global Series, a worldwide Clash Royale tournament